Wonderful Life may refer to:
Wonderful Life (book), a 1989 book on evolution by Stephen Jay Gould

Film and television 
Wonderful Life (1964 film), 1964 film starring Cliff Richard
Wonderful Life (2018 film), a 2017 fantasy film directed by Jo Won-hee
Wonderful Life, original Japanese title of After Life, a 1998 Japanese film directed by Hirokazu Koreeda
Wonderful Life (2004 TV series), 2004 Japanese television drama
Wonderful Life (2005 TV series), 2005 South Korean television drama

Music

Albums 
 Wonderful Life (Black album), 1987
 Wonderful Life (Cliff Richard album), 1964

Songs 
 "Wonderful Life" (Black song), the title track from the 1987 album
 "Wonderful Life" (Bring Me The Horizon song), 2019
 "Wonderful Life" (Hurts song), 2010
 "Wonderful Life", a song by Alter Bridge from their 2010 album AB III
 "Wonderful Life", a song and title track from the 1964 Cliff Richard with the Shadows album Wonderful Life 
 "Wonderful Life", a song by Estelle from her 2012 album All of Me
 "Wonderful Life", a song by Gwen Stefani from her 2006 album The Sweet Escape
 "Wonderful Life", a song by Nick Cave and the Bad Seeds from their 2003 album Nocturama
 "Wonderful Life", a song by T.I. from his 2012 album Trouble Man: Heavy Is the Head
 "Wonderful Life", a cover song by Katie Melua based on Black's unique work.

See also
A Wonderful Life (disambiguation)
It's a Wonderful Life (disambiguation)